Van Gogh House is a cultural site in Nieuw-Amsterdam, in the province of Drenthe in the Netherlands. The painter Vincent van Gogh stayed here for two months in 1883; the house is now a museum.

History

Van Gogh in Drenthe
Vincent van Gogh lived in Drenthe for three months from September 1883. He arrived in Hoogeveen, from The Hague, by train on 11 September, and lived in a guest house there for about two weeks.

He travelled by canal boat to Nieuw-Amsterdam, and lodged in a room in this house from 2 October. He explored the area, and he drew and painted. He wrote many letters to his brother Theo in Paris.

On 4 December he returned to Hoogeveen, and from there travelled by train to Nuenen, his parents' home.

The house

The house was built in 1870 by J. A. Willinge Gratama, a lawyer in Assen. In 1876 he sold it  to Hendrik Scholte: he was van Gogh's host during the painter's stay in Nieuw-Amsterdam. In 1904 Scholte sold the house to his son-in-law Andries Mol, and others later owned the building.

In 1997 the Stichting Van Gogh & Drenthe (Van Gogh & Drenthe Foundation) began to plan its restoration, and the Van Gogh House was opened as a museum in March 2003. The room once occupied by van Gogh is shown with furniture and his painting equipment, as it would have been during his stay.

References

Biographical museums in the Netherlands
Art museums and galleries in the Netherlands
Vincent van Gogh
Museums in Drenthe
Van Gogh